Separate tank battalions were military formations used by the United States Army during World War II, especially in the European Theater of Operations. These battalions were temporarily attached to infantry, armored, or airborne divisions according to need, though at least one battalion (745th Tank Battalion) spent the entire war in Europe attached to one division. They were also known as general headquarters ("GHQ") tank battalions.

Background

The advent of highly mobile and reliable tanks radically changed the nature of warfare during World War II. The use of tanks and other vehicles to create decisive breakthroughs became commonplace. The German blitzkrieg and Soviet deep battle called for large, maneuverable armored forces to be concentrated in one area of the front to overwhelm enemy defenses, with the aim of surrounding and cutting off the enemy formations left behind. This strategy was in contrast to previous ideas of armored warfare, namely that tanks should support infantry thrusts and assaults, and that armored units should be broken up into smaller groups to support infantry action.

The Armored Force was created by U.S. Army planners in July 1940 to enact this new doctrine. Made up mainly of armored divisions, this force would be the main offensive element on the battlefield. In order to bolster this force, separate tank battalions were formed, mainly with the aim of using them as part of the armored strategy but also allowing them to be used in other areas. This strategy was further validated by the experience during the Battle of Kasserine Pass which had proven to the U.S. Army the importance of concentrating armored units rather than spreading them out. However, not all engagements could be best solved through massed armored attacks. Terrain was an especially important variable, with hills, forests, swamps and bocage being natural barriers to fast-moving vehicular units. This ensured that infantry still had a very important place, especially when conditions favored advancing across a broad front. In order for infantry to successfully engage an enemy, having tanks available to support this engagement was seen by many infantry commanders as an important priority.

The Invasion of Normandy and the subsequent breakout confirmed the need for tanks to support infantry. Infantry units found that tank support was essential in defeating German formations entrenched in towns and amongst the bocage. From that moment on, until the end of the war in Europe, separate tank battalions were attached to as many infantry divisions as possible. While armored divisions were expected to perform the massed breakout thrusts that were increasingly commonplace in Europe, the smaller battalions were essential in supporting and maintaining smaller infantry advances. Armored and airborne divisions also received separate tank battalions when they were needed to successfully complete their objectives.

Origin
The 70th Tank Battalion was the U.S. Army's first separate tank battalion, activated on June 15, 1940, from Regular Army troops. Four more separate tank battalions (the 191st–194th) were formed soon after from National Guard tank companies from California, Connecticut, Illinois, Kentucky, Massachusetts, New York, Ohio, Virginia, and Wisconsin. More battalions were activated throughout 1942 and 1943.

An important event that helped create many separate tank battalions was an organizational change in armored divisions that occurred in late 1943. Planners decided that the original 1942 armored division model containing six tank battalions was too large. The 1943 model slightly reduced the number of tanks and reorganised from six to three tank battalions. As a result, the U.S. Army fielded two different types of armored division during the war: the "heavy" armored division, based on the 1942 structure (which applied to armored divisions already overseas when the change took place, the 1st, 2nd, and 3rd) and the "light" armored division based on the 1944 structure (which would apply to all newer armored divisions, the 4th–14th, 16th, and 20th). One of the consequences of this change of organization was that the newer armored divisions lost three tank battalions, all of which were either shifted into incomplete armored divisions, turned into separate battalions, or deactivated.

Structure

It was originally determined that there would be a mix of light tank battalions and medium tank battalions in the field in both Europe and Italy. However, the limitations of the M5 Stuart light tank in tank-versus-tank combat, along with increasing numbers of mass-produced M4 Sherman medium tanks, eventually forced a change into a mixed unit of both light and medium tanks.

By 1944, the structure of the separate tank battalion was identical to tank battalions assigned to armored divisions. The battalion consisted of three medium tank companies (usually A, B and C) and one light tank company (usually company D). Each medium tank company had seventeen M4 Sherman medium tanks (in three platoons of five tanks, with two more in the company headquarters) and a single Sherman with a 105 mm howitzer an assault tank. The light tank company had seventeen M3 or M5 Stuart tanks (organized identically to the medium tank company, minus the assault gun), which began to be replaced late in the war by M24 Chaffee light tanks. The battalion also had a service company and a headquarters company, the latter having additional firepower in the form of three more M4 or M4A3 105 mm assault guns and a platoon of three mortar-equipped halftracks. The total number of tanks and assault guns was 74, though few battalions operated for any period of time with a full complement after entering combat.

Experience

The separate tank battalions performed well in Europe and Italy, but new equipment was prioritised for the armored divisions. This meant that these battalions were slow to receive upgraded equipment, such as the 76 mm Sherman and the new M24 Chaffee.

One example of this occurred to the 752nd Tank Battalion, serving in Italy. It was February 1945 before the unit was equipped with 76 mm Shermans. In March, however, the battalion was issued 17 new M24 Chaffee light tanks. This proved a boon to operations:

Since the light tankers were now equipped with 75 mm guns, they were moved into the lines for additional fire power, and to relieve some of the medium units which had been in position constantly since the previous October.

But it appears that the new tanks had been issued in error. A few weeks later they were taken away and the battalion was re-issued M5s.

The battalion were then issued a "reserve company" of older M4 Shermans to do with as they saw fit:

Seventeen M4 tanks had been received as a reserve pool for the outfit, and each of the medium companies exchanged one platoon of their M4A3s for an equal number of the 75 mm tanks. Plans called for the use of the older tanks to be used in advancing through the mine fields, and the newer jobs to be held as replacements in the event of loss or damage in the advance. Some 50 additional men were also drawn by the Battalion and were assigned to Dog company to be held as reserves. The new men were given a rapid orientation course on the tanks and were tentatively assigned to the reserve vehicles to form an emergency company in the event of its being needed.

The infantry support role was also augmented by the presence of Tank Destroyer battalions, which were originally created to blunt potential armored thrusts by the enemy. But, after the Battle of the Bulge, German armor was rarely used en masse, which allowed them to be used more in support roles.

Tactics

Separate tank battalions were rarely, if ever, used as a single formation in combat, and spent most of their time attached to infantry divisions. The U.S. infantry division of World War II contained three infantry regiments, and each medium tank company was usually assigned to a regiment for close support operations. This could be broken down even further when required, with each of the three tank platoons of a medium tank company being assigned to one of the regiment's three infantry battalions. When breaking out of the Bocage in Normandy, the smallest possible combination—a single tank operating with a nine-man infantry squad—was often used.

The light tank company was seldom used in direct infantry support missions, and usually served in a screening role or to augment the division's cavalry reconnaissance troop in their operations. This was due to the severe limitations of the M5 Stuart light tank, which, by 1944, was under-gunned and too lightly armored to be effective in anything but reconnaissance missions (the 752nd Tank Battalion referred to the 37mm gun as a "peashooter").

The longer a separate tank battalion spent attached to a single division, the smoother the combined operations were, since both infantry and armored units became familiar with each other and with the necessary tactics. Yet, this was not always possible, as the tank battalion would often be moved somewhere else and attached to a different division.

The experience of the 782nd Tank Battalion in late April 1945 was fairly typical once it joined the 97th Infantry Division in Bavaria, with the three medium companies being assigned to the infantry regiments while the light company was assigned to various duties under divisional control:Sections of the Reconnaissance Platoon were attached to each of the companies to act as liaison between Battalion Headquarters and the Companies. Two platoons of Company "D" remained at Hof to guard the Eastern approaches of the city from an expected counter-attack, while one platoon of Company "D", together with the Assault Gun Platoon, joined the 97th Reconnaissance Troop in the northwestern Sudeten city of Rossbach. The remainder of Headquarters Company and all of Service Company remained under Battalion control, all being part of the Division Reserve. The Division front now extended from Rossbach in the north to Tirschenreuth in the south. The platoon from Company "D" and the Assault Gun Platoon, with the Reconnaissance Troop, on the left flank, the 386th and the 387th Regimental Combat Teams in the center, and the 303rd on the right flank. Service Company had the difficult task of keeping the widely scattered tanks supplied with gas and ammunition, a job excellently performed. Frequently Company "D" provided light tanks to act as armed guards for the thin skinned trucks shuttling to the front.

The 782nd also experienced the mutual relationship with the infantry, where both served to protect the other:

(T)he tanks proved a great asset to the Doughboys as the enemy was strongest in automatic and semi-automatic fire, so dangerous to the Infantry. The Infantry, on the other hand, protected the tanks from the ever-present Panzerfaust and 88 fire, deadly against armor. The tanks also proved valuable in blowing up road blocks and mounting up the Infantry to exploit the rout of the fast-crumbling remnants of the German Army.

Post-war
The success of the separate tank battalions helped to convince planners that infantry divisions should have their own organic armored units rather than have tank units attached to them temporarily. This argument was helped by the "failure" of towed and self-propelled tank destroyer battalions in fulfilling their primary mission—providing quick, massed anti-tank fire against a large German armored thrust. This failure was partly due to the rarity of German armored thrusts throughout the ETO, and partly due to a lack of firepower (at least until the M36 turned up in late 1944). As a result, self-propelled tank destroyer units were often used in the same way as separate tank battalions—providing fire support for infantry actions. Nevertheless, their thinly armored hulls and open turret tops made them more vulnerable to enemy fire.

By the war's end, infantry division commanders "unanimously agreed that they would prefer to have the support of a tank battalion instead of a tank destroyer battalion". The result was a belief that each infantry division should have its own dedicated battalion of three tank companies, with each company serving one of the three Infantry Regiments.

U.S. divisions in the Korean War all had a single tank battalion attached to them. The hilly Korean Peninsula made it difficult for tanks to be used in a breakthrough role, so all of the UN forces were infantry units with various tank battalions attached for infantry support. The Battle of Pusan Perimeter order of battle shows this very clearly.

By the mid 1950s, the US Pentomic Division model had a tank battalion attached as standard. , U.S. Marine divisions all have their own organic tank battalions.

Units

Notes
Notes

References

</ref>
Armoured warfare
Tank battalions of the United States Army